Mads Ellef Langaard (3 May 1815 – 23 March 1891) was a Norwegian brewery owner and industrialist. He was the founder of the brewery Frydenlunds bryggeri, now a division of Ringnes.

Personal life 
Langaard was born at Lillesand  in Aust-Agder, Norway to sea captain Mads Christian Langaard (1774-1854) and his wife, Ellevine Ellefsen (1792-1874). He was a brother of  tobacco manufacturer Conrad Langaard and father of Christian Langaard, who succeeded in the management of Frydenlund Brewery.

Career 
In 1841, he  moved to  Christiania (now Oslo). In 1850 he established Langaard & Dietrichson together with C. A. Dietrichson. The partnership operated in export and import. In 1859, Langaard founded the brewery Frydenlund Bryggeri in Christiania  together with three partners; Abraham Hesselberg, Justus Heinrich Schwensen and  Knud Knudsen.  After some startup problems, the brewery became an economic success, and Langaard started other companies, and was involved in mining, forestry and shipping. He established Follum Tresliperi in 1873 and Lillehammer Dampsag og Høvleri in 1876.

He was decorated Knight of the Order of St. Olav in 1887. Mads Langaard died during 1891 and was buried on Vår Frelsers gravlund in Oslo.

References

1815 births
1891 deaths
People from Lillesand
Norwegian brewers
Norwegian industrialists
Norwegian company founders
Burials at the Cemetery of Our Saviour